Stanley Mills Jr. (December 3, 1893 – April 1933) was an American football fullback in the National Football League. He played two seasons with the Green Bay Packers before spending his final season with the Akron Pros.

Green Bay Packers players
Akron Pros players
Penn State Nittany Lions football players
1893 births
1933 deaths